Kum Ga (also Matao) is a settlement in Kachin State, Burma.

References

Populated places in Kachin State